Sokoto North is a Local Government Area in Sokoto State, Nigeria. Its headquarters is in the state capital of Sokoto.

It has an area of 51 km and had a population of 232,846 at the 2006 census.

The postal code of the area is 840.

 Sokoto North it is Sultanet Place

References

Local Government Areas in Sokoto State